KPV is a heavy machine gun.

KPV or kpv may also refer to:
 KPV Kokkola or Kokkolan Palloveikot, an association football club from Kokkola, Finland
 Kashipur Junction railway station's Indian Railway station code
 Komi-Zyrian language's ISO 639 code
 Perryville Airport's IATA code
 KPV LV, a political party in Latvia